Xymene teres is a species of predatory sea snail, a marine gastropod mollusc in the family Muricidae, the rock snails or murex snails.

Distribution
This marine species is endemic to New Zealand.

References

 Powell A W B, New Zealand Mollusca, William Collins Publishers Ltd, Auckland, New Zealand 1979 
 Finlay H.J. (1930) Additions to the Recent fauna of New Zealand. No. 3. Transactions and Proceedings of the Royal Society of New Zealand 61: 222-247.

Gastropods of New Zealand
Gastropods described in 1930
Taxa named by Harold John Finlay
Xymene